Tewksbury Township is a township located in Hunterdon County, in the U.S. state of New Jersey and is located within the New York Metropolitan Area. As of the 2020 United States census, the township's population was 5,870, a decrease of 123 (−2.1%) from the 2010 census count of 5,993, which in turn reflected an increase of 452 (+8.2%) from the 5,541 counted in the 2000 census. It is located within the Raritan Valley region.

The township has been one of the state's highest-income communities. Based on data from the 2012–2016 American Community Survey (ACS), NJ.com ranked the township as having the fifth-highest income in the state, with a median household income of $173,473. Based on data from the 2014–2018 ACS, the township residents had a median household income of $162,037, more than double the statewide median of $79,363.

The township's name is thought to be from Tewkesbury, England. Since 2003, the two communities have been twinned.

History
The area was originally settled by the Lenape Native Americans. European settlement began in 1708, when George Willocks acquired land from the Lenape in the area, followed by an acquisition by the proprietors of West Jersey of a tract covering .

The township was first mentioned as holding a township meeting on March 11, 1755, as having been formed partly from Lebanon Township, though the exact circumstances of its formation by charter are unknown. Tewksbury was incorporated as one of New Jersey's initial 104 townships by an act of the New Jersey Legislature on February 21, 1798. Portions of the township were taken to form Califon borough (April 2, 1898). Portions of the township were acquired from Readington Township in 1832 and 1861, and portions were transferred to Clinton Township in 1871 and 1891.

The earliest European settlers were of English extraction and were followed by a large German contingent who began to settle in the area around 1749 and became the strongest influence around the time Tewksbury became a township. Their community was known as New Germantown, a name that survived until World War I when prejudice against Germans led residents to change the community's name to Oldwick. The more than 100 structures and its mixture of Victorian, Federal, New England and Georgian style homes in Oldwick is protected by its listing on the National Register of Historic Places. Established in 1714 and granted a Royal Charter in 1767, Zion Lutheran Church in Oldwick is the oldest German Lutheran parish in New Jersey.

Oldwick is home to Mane Stream, a Professional Association of Therapeutic Horsemanship (PATH) Premier Accredited Center for therapeutic horseback riding.

Geography

According to the United States Census Bureau, the township had a total area of 31.78 square miles (82.30 km2), including 31.65 square miles (81.96 km2) of land and 0.13 square miles (0.34 km2) of water (0.41%).

Tewksbury Township borders Califon, Clinton Township, Lebanon Township and Readington Township in Hunterdon County; Chester Township and Washington Township in Morris County; and Bedminster Township in Somerset County.

Unincorporated communities, localities and place names located partially or completely within the township include Apgar's Corner, Bissell, Cokesbury, Fairmount, Farmersville, Fox Hill, Laurel Farms, Lower Fairmount, Mountainville, New Germantown, Oldwick, Pottersville, Sutton and Vernoy.

Demographics

2010 census

The Census Bureau's 2006–2010 American Community Survey showed that (in 2010 inflation-adjusted dollars) median household income was $160,224 (with a margin of error of +/− $13,609) and the median family income was $189,833 (+/− $21,901). Males had a median income of $128,177 (+/− $22,406) versus $90,833 (+/− $32,868) for females. The per capita income for the borough was $91,644 (+/− $13,544). About 0.9% of families and 1.2% of the population were below the poverty line, including 1.3% of those under age 18 and 1.9% of those age 65 or over.

2000 census
As of the 2000 United States census there were 5,541 people, 1,986 households, and 1,662 families residing in the township. The population density was 175.2 people per square mile (67.6/km2). There were 2,052 housing units at an average density of 64.9 per square mile (25.0/km2). The racial makeup of the township was 96.82% White, 0.52% African American, 1.88% Asian, 0.27% from other races, and 0.51% from two or more races. Hispanic or Latino of any race were 1.53% of the population.

There were 1,996 households, out of which 36.6% had children under the age of 18 living with them, 77.2% were married couples living together, 5.1% had a female householder with no husband present, and 16.3% were non-families. 12.5% of all households were made up of individuals, and 4.5% had someone living alone who was 65 years of age or older. The average household size was 2.79 and the average family size was 3.05.

In the township the population was spread out, with 26.2% under the age of 18, 3.6% from 18 to 24, 25.2% from 25 to 44, 33.7% from 45 to 64, and 11.2% who were 65 years of age or older. The median age was 43 years. For every 100 females, there were 97.0 males. For every 100 females age 18 and over, there were 96.7 males.

The median income for a household in the township was $135,649, and the median income for a family was $150,189. Males had a median income of $100,000 versus $57,500 for females. The per capita income for the township was $65,470. About 1.6% of families and 2.7% of the population were below the poverty line, including 3.9% of those under age 18 and 1.5% of those age 65 or over.

Parks and recreation
Tewksbury Township hosts part of a rail trail that was created out of the former Central Railroad of New Jersey High Bridge Branch. The trail is maintained by Hunterdon County Parks and Recreation and is called the Columbia Trail, which includes a scenic area known as the Ken Lockwood Gorge.

Government

Local government
Tewksbury Township is governed under the Township form of government, one of 141 municipalities (of the 564) statewide governed under this form. The Township Committee is comprised of five members, who are elected directly by the voters at-large in partisan elections to serve three-year terms of office on a staggered basis, with either one or two seats coming up for election each year as part of the November general election in a three-year cycle. At an annual reorganization meeting, the Township Committee selects one of its members to serve as Mayor and another as Deputy Mayor.

, members of the Tewksbury Township Committee are Mayor Andrea B. Maranca (R, term on township committee and as mayor ends December 31, 2022), Deputy Mayor Jean Frankel (R, term on committee ends 2023; term as deputy mayor ends 2022), Dana D. Desiderio (R, 2024), Peter L. Melick (R, 2024) and William J. Voyce (R, 2022).

In 2018, the township had an average property tax bill of $14,367, the highest in the county, compared to an average bill of $8,767 statewide.

Federal, state and county representation
Tewksbury Township is located in the 7th Congressional District and is part of New Jersey's 23rd state legislative district. Prior to the 2011 reapportionment following the 2010 Census, Tewksbury Township had been in the 24th state legislative district.

Politics
As of March 2011, there were a total of 4,425 registered voters in Tewksbury Township, of which 699 (15.8%) were registered as Democrats, 2,310 (52.2%) were registered as Republicans and 1,412 (31.9%) were registered as Unaffiliated. There were 4 voters registered as Libertarians or Greens.

In the 2020 presidential election, Republican Donald Trump received 52.9% (2,245 votes) of the vote, compared to 45.6% (1,931 votes) for Joe Biden and 1.4% (61 votes) for all other candidates. In the 2016 presidential election, Republican Donald Trump received 57.6% (2,109 votes) of the vote, compared to 38.3% (1,402 votes) for Hillary Rodham Clinton and 4.1% (151 votes) for all other candidates. In the 2012 presidential election, Republican Mitt Romney received 66.6% of the vote (2,291 cast), ahead of Democrat Barack Obama with 32.0% (1,100 votes), and other candidates with 1.5% (51 votes), among the 3,478 ballots cast by the township's 4,628 registered voters (36 ballots were spoiled), for a turnout of 75.2%. In the 2008 presidential election, Republican John McCain received 60.7% of the vote (2,280 cast), ahead of Democrat Barack Obama with 37.4% (1,403 votes) and other candidates with 1.0% (39 votes), among the 3,754 ballots cast by the township's 4,502 registered voters, for a turnout of 83.4%.

In the 2004 presidential election, Republican George W. Bush received 66.7% of the vote (2,321 ballots cast), outpolling Democrat John Kerry with 33.2% (1,156 votes) and other candidates with 0.6% (25 votes), among the 3,480 ballots cast by the township's 4,171 registered voters, for a turnout percentage of 83.4. In the 2013 gubernatorial election, Republican Chris Christie received 77.8% of the vote (1,706 cast), ahead of Democrat Barbara Buono with 20.3% (445 votes), and other candidates with 1.9% (41 votes), among the 2,238 ballots cast by the township's 4,551 registered voters (46 ballots were spoiled), for a turnout of 49.2%. In the 2009 gubernatorial election, Republican Chris Christie received 66.7% of the vote (1,982 ballots cast), ahead of  Democrat Jon Corzine with 21.5% (638 votes), Independent Chris Daggett with 10.4% (310 votes) and other candidates with 0.2% (5 votes), among the 2,971 ballots cast by the township's 4,434 registered voters, yielding a 67.0% turnout.

Education
The Tewksbury Township Schools is a public school district, which serves students in kindergarten through eighth grade. As of the 2018–19 school year, the district, comprised of two schools, had an enrollment of 541 students and 60.4 classroom teachers (on an FTE basis), for a student–teacher ratio of 9.0:1. Schools in the district (with 2018–19 enrollment data from the National Center for Education Statistics) are 
Tewksbury Elementary School with 321 students in grades Pre-K–4 and 
Old Turnpike School with 214 students in grades 5–8. Tewksbury Elementary School was recognized in 2011 as a Blue Ribbon School by the United States Department of Education. Old Turnpike School was one of nine schools in New Jersey honored in 2020 by the National Blue Ribbon Schools Program, which recognizes high student achievement.

The original elementary school, Sawmill, opened in 1951 and was sold in 2003 for $1 million to the Hunterdon County Educational Services Commission.

Public school students in ninth through twelfth grades attend Voorhees High School in Lebanon Township (although the mailing address is Glen Gardner), which also serves students from Califon Borough, Glen Gardner Borough, Hampton Borough, High Bridge Borough and Lebanon Township. As of the 2018–19 school year, the high school had an enrollment of 982 students and 83.1 classroom teachers (on an FTE basis), for a student–teacher ratio of 11.8:1. The school is part of the North Hunterdon-Voorhees Regional High School District, which also includes students from Bethlehem Township, Clinton Town, Clinton Township, Franklin Township, Lebanon Borough and Union Township who attend North Hunterdon High School in Annandale.

Eighth grade students from all of Hunterdon County are eligible to apply to attend the high school programs offered by the Hunterdon County Vocational School District, a county-wide vocational school district that offers career and technical education at its campuses in Raritan Township and at programs sited at local high schools, with no tuition charged to students for attendance.

Transportation

Roads and highways

There are several roadways that traverse the township. Interstate 78 passes through the Township, and is accessible via Oldwick Road (County Route 523) at Exit 24. County Route 517 also passes through the Township.

Notable people

People who were born in, residents of, or otherwise closely associated with Tewksbury Township include:

 Harriet Adams (1892–1982), novelist and publisher who authored some 200 books including many in the Nancy Drew series (under the pseudonym Carolyn Keene) and a few in the Hardy Boys series (under the pseudonym Franklin W. Dixon)
 Joseph Alexander Adams (1803–1880), engraver
 John Amos (born 1939), actor
 Dan Cocoziello (born 1985), professional lacrosse player
 Everett Fagan (1918–1983), professional baseball player during the 1940s
 Eileen Ford (1922–2014), co-founder of Ford Modeling Agency, now called Ford Models
 Gerard W. Ford (1924–2008), co-founder of Ford Modeling Agency, now called Ford Models
 James Gandolfini (1961–2013), actor best known for his lead role in the HBO series The Sopranos
 Lawrence R. Hafstad (1904–1993), electrical engineer and physicist notable for his pioneering work on nuclear reactors.
 Alison Haislip (born 1981), actress and correspondent for G4tv's Attack of the Show!
 Andrew Horowitz (born 1983), musician/singer in Tally Hall
 Kamine family, owners of Olympic horse Royal Kaliber.
 Charlie Murphy (1959–2017), actor and comedian
 Joe Piscopo (born 1951), actor and comedian
 Webster B. Todd (1899–1989), businessman, Republican leader, and father of Christine Todd Whitman
 Frederica von Stade (born 1945), opera singer
 George David Weiss (1921–2010), songwriter and former President of the Songwriters Guild of America
 Christine Todd Whitman (born 1946), 50th Governor of New Jersey
 John Whitman (1944–2015), businessman, investment banker and husband of Christine Todd Whitman
 Kate Whitman Annis (born ), general manager of the Metropolitan Riveters of the National Women's Hockey League

References

External links

 Tewksbury Township website
 Tewksbury Historical Society
 Hunterdon County webpage for Tewksbury Township
 Tewksbury Township Schools
 
 School Data for the Tewksbury Township Schools, National Center for Education Statistics
 North Hunterdon-Voorhees Regional High School District
  Tewksbury Rescue Squad – STATION 24
 Tewksbury Open Records website (not Town sponsored)
 Hunterdon Land Trust Alliance
 Somerset Hills Handicapped Riding Center
 Tewksbury 5 Miler

 
1798 establishments in New Jersey
Palatine German settlement in New Jersey
Populated places established in 1798
Township form of New Jersey government
Townships in Hunterdon County, New Jersey